Helmut Böck (born 14 February 1931) was a West German Nordic skier who competed in the 1950s. He finished 19th in the Nordic combined event at the 1956 Winter Olympics in Cortina d'Ampezzo. Böck also competed in the 18 km event at the 1952 Winter Olympics in Oslo, but did not finish. He was born in Nesselwang.

References 
 18 km Olympic cross country results: 1948–52
 Olympic nordic combined results: 1948–64

1931 births
Living people
Olympic cross-country skiers of Germany
Olympic Nordic combined skiers of the United Team of Germany
Cross-country skiers at the 1952 Winter Olympics
Nordic combined skiers at the 1952 Winter Olympics
Nordic combined skiers at the 1956 Winter Olympics
German male cross-country skiers
German male Nordic combined skiers
German male ski jumpers
People from Ostallgäu
Sportspeople from Swabia (Bavaria)